Parachute Youth was the musical project of Mathew KVon and Johnny Castro (John Courtidis), a duo originating from Australia in December 2011. Their music is indie house, and their labels include Sweat It Out, Warner Music, and Ultra Music.

Their first track, Can't Get Better Than This, was released on 28 January 2012 in Australia, and charted in Belgium. In 2013 they moved to London to continue their career. They released Runaway on 19 November 2013 as part of their second single.

The pair split up on 4 February 2014, with Castro commencing a solo project "Yeah Boy", signed to Atlantic Records / Warner Music. He released the EP "Can't Get Enough" on 5 May 2014.

Music video
A music video to accompany the release of Can't Get Better Than This was first released on YouTube on 21 December 2011. The video has a length of three minutes and forty seconds.

Track listing

Chart performance

Russia 1

Release history

References

External links
 Official website

Musical groups established in 2011
Australian indie pop groups
2011 establishments in Australia